Planiliza is a genus of mullets found in coastal marine waters, estuaries and rivers in the Indo-Pacific.

Taxonomy
The genus Planiliza was resurrected for nearly all Indo-Pacific species previously assigned to Liza because DNA-based cladistic analyses recovered Liza as polyphyletic, with some species placed as sister to the Chelon type species and nearly all Indo-Pacific species to Planiliza.

Species
The following species are classified under Planiliza by FishBase:

 Planiliza abu (Heckel, 1843) (Abu mullet)
 Planiliza affinis (Günther, 1861) (Eastern keelback mullet)
 Planiliza alata (Steindachner, 1892) (Diamond mullet) 
 Planiliza carinata (Valenciennes, 1836) (Keeled mullet)
 Planiliza haematocheila (Temminck & Schlegel, 1845) (So-iny Mullet) 
 Planiliza klunzingeri (F. Day, 1888) (Klunzinger's mullet)
 Planiliza macrolepis (A. Smith, 1846) (Largescale mullet) 
 Planiliza mandapamensis J. M. Thomson, 1997 (Indian mullet)
 Planiliza melinoptera (Valenciennes, 1836) (Otomebora mullet) 
 Planiliza persicus (Senou, J. E. Randall & Okiyama, 1995) (Persian mullet) 
 Planiliza planiceps (Valenciennes, 1836) (Tade gray mullet)
 Planiliza ramsayi (W. J. Macleay, 1883) (Ramsay's mullet)
 Planiliza subviridis (Valenciennes, 1836) (Greenback mullet)

References

 
Taxa named by Gilbert Percy Whitley
Mugilidae